The 1954 United States Senate election in Oklahoma took place on November 2, 1954. Incumbent Democratic Senator Robert S. Kerr ran for re-election to a second term. He faced strong competition in the Democratic primary from former Governor Roy J. Turner, and though he won a sizable victory over Turner in the primary, he fell shy of an outright majority. Turner, however, withdrew from the race before a runoff election could be held. On the Republican side, U.S. Attorney Fred Mock won the nomination following a runoff against newspaper publisher Raymond Fields. In the general election, Kerr ended up easily defeating Mock, but with a significantly reduced victory from 1948.

Democratic primary

Candidates
 Robert S. Kerr, incumbent U.S. Senator
 Roy J. Turner, former Governor of Oklahoma
 David C. Shapard, Oklahoma City attorney
 George H. Hunt
 Jess L. Pullen
 Henry Harding
 A.B. McDonald
 Jeff McHenry
 Sooner Singleton

Results

Following the Democratic primary, Kerr had a sizable lead over Turner, but fell just short of a majority, thereby triggering a runoff election. However, several weeks after the primary, Turner withdrew from the runoff, announcing that he would not be able to adequately finance his campaign. After Turner's withdrawal, David C. Shapard, who placed a distant third in the primary, announced that he would attempt to force a runoff with Kerr. The State Election Board denied Kerr's request, and he appealed to the state Supreme Court, which quickly denied his appeal, concluding that his claim had no "apparent merit."

Runoff election results

Republican primary

Candidates
 Fred M. Mock, U.S. Attorney for the Western District of Oklahoma
 Raymond H. Fields, newspaper publisher, 1950 Republican candidate for the U.S. Senate
 Ernest G. Albright 
 Frank A. Anderson

Results

Runoff election results

General election

Results

References

Oklahoma
1954
1954 Oklahoma elections